Ohio Brush Creek is a  tributary of the Ohio River in southern Ohio in the United States. According to the Geographic Names Information System, it has also been known historically as "Brush Creek," "Elk Creek," and "Little Scioto River".

See also
List of rivers of Ohio

References

Rivers of Ohio
Tributaries of the Ohio River
Rivers of Adams County, Ohio
Rivers of Highland County, Ohio